Alain Johannes Mociulski (born May 2, 1962) is a Chilean-American multi-instrumentalist and vocalist, whose primary instruments are guitar and bass. He is a founding member of several bands, including the alternative rock group Eleven, and has been involved with acts such as hard rock band Queens of the Stone Age, Them Crooked Vultures, PJ Harvey, Chris Cornell, Arctic Monkeys, Mark Lanegan and The Desert Sessions, both as a musician and as a producer.

Alain Johannes is nephew of Chilean  musician Peter Rock.  He was born in Santiago de Chile. He was married to Natasha Shneider from 1987 until her death in 2008.

Career
In his teen years, Johannes formed the band Chain Reaction (later Anthym) with Hillel Slovak, Todd Strassman, and Jack Irons. 
This band was later renamed What Is This. Todd Strassman was replaced by Flea, who was replaced, upon leaving the band, by Chris Hutchinson.

In 1987, Johannes and Natasha Shneider released the album Walk the Moon under the MCA label. Reportedly, Chris Hutchinson and Jack Irons played on some of its tracks.

Eleven was formed in 1990 and released their debut album Awake in a Dream in 1991, which included the pop based singles "Rainbows End" and "All Together". They followed this with regular releases Eleven in 1993, Thunk! in 1995, Avantgardedog in 2000, and Howling Book in 2003.

Johannes was the only other contributor on the 1996 debut album by Jason Falkner, Jason Falkner Presents Author Unknown. He was also a significant contributor to Chris Cornell's 1999 solo album, Euphoria Morning as a guitarist, writer and producer. He also toured as part of Chris Cornell's band in support of this album. He mixed and played on Jack Irons' first solo record, Attention Dimension, released in 2004, and he co-wrote on Danish stoner rock outfit The Royal Highness.

In 2005, he joined Queens of the Stone Age to play guitar as well as bass on Lullabies to Paralyze. He had previously guested on Lullabies''' predecessor, Songs for the Deaf, having also co-written the track "Hanging Tree" during one of The Desert Sessions. He would participate in the tour for the album and appears on the live DVD, Over the Years and Through the Woods in the main concert. Johannes once again contributed a main role to Lullabies'  follow up, Era Vulgaris, but he opted to concentrate on Eleven with Natasha Shneider, and the pair bowed out of touring before the album's promotion started.

In 2007, Johannes became a part of Brody Dalle's post-Distillers effort, Spinnerette.

In August 2009, he joined Them Crooked Vultures, with Foo Fighters frontman Dave Grohl, Queens of the Stone Age frontman Josh Homme and former Led Zeppelin bass player John Paul Jones. Johannes contributed guitar, bass, keyboards, and backing vocals on their 2009–2010 tour, often playing his own solo guitar section during the set.

In late 2008, a song he co-wrote with Shneider, Time for Miracles, was recorded by Adam Lambert and used in the movie 2012.

On October 5, 2010, he released his solo debut album Spark, a tribute to the late Natasha Shneider.

On September 5, 2012, Jimmy Eat World announced that he would be a producer/engineer on their 8th studio album.

In 2013, he became a player in Dave Grohl's Sound City Players project, writing and recording a song for the album, and playing a major role in the live performances.

On November 11, 2014, he released his second solo album, Fragments and Wholes Vol. 1, drawing inspiration from the death of his parents as well as that of Natasha Shneider.

Johannes began working with PJ Harvey in 2014. From 2016 to 2017, Johannes was a part of PJ Harvey's touring ensemble for her world tour in support of her album The Hope Six Demolition Project. He also played on the album itself.

In 2015, he was the producer of K's Choice album The Phantom Cowboy,  and Edith Crash's Partir.

In 2016, he composed and performed the soundtrack for the Ubisoft game, Tom Clancy's Ghost Recon Wildlands.

In 2020, his third solo record Hum'' was released on Ipecac Records to favorable critical reviews 

On September 3, 2022, Them Crooked Vultures reunited for a performance at Wembley Stadium in honour of Foo Fighters' late drummer Taylor Hawkins and again on September 27, 2022 at the KIA Forum for the second tribute show.

Selected discography
Throughout his career Johannes has worked with a wide range of artists and bands in various genres as a musician, record engineer and producer.

References

External links
Johannes' MySpace page
In-depth retrospective interview on Jekyll and Hyde, 106FM Jerusalem

1962 births
Living people
American rock guitarists
American male guitarists
American alternative rock musicians
American people of Chilean descent
Queens of the Stone Age members
Spinnerette members
What Is This? members
Fairfax High School (Los Angeles) alumni
People from Santiago
Ipecac Recordings artists
20th-century American guitarists
Them Crooked Vultures members
Eleven (band) members